Timothy Wellington Muffitt (born 1961) is an American conductor.

Biography
Timothy Muffitt was born in Bridgeport, Connecticut, and began playing the piano at the age of seven, later adding viola and trumpet. He studied music at the Eastman School of Music, training in orchestral direction under the guidance of David Effron, earning a degree in Doctor of Musical Arts.

Musical career
Muffitt has been the music director and conductor of the Baton Rouge Symphony Orchestra since 1999, as well as music director and conductor of the Lansing Symphony Orchestra since 2006.

In the past, Muffitt was the associate conductor of the Austin Symphony Orchestra and the artistic director of the Louisiana Philharmonic Orchestra of New Orleans in relation to the Casual Classics Series.

In addition to his work with professional orchestras, Muffitt is also the artistic director of the Chautauqua Institution Music School and the conductor of the Chautauqua's Music School Festival Orchestra, one of the best orchestral groups in the country.

He also appears with other major orchestras throughout the country, including the Saint Louis Symphony, the Tulsa Symphony, the San Francisco Symphony and the Long Beach Symphony. He also recently debuted at the Hollywood Bowl.

Other Muffitt collaborations have been with the symphony orchestras of Houston, Phoenix, Edmonton and Spokane, with the Pro Musica Chamber Orchestra of Columbus Ohio, the Buffalo Philharmonic, the Virginia Symphony, the Grant Park Music Festival Orchestra of Chicago and the Harrisburg Symphony Orchestra.

He has worked with important artists and composers such as Yo-Yo Ma, Renee Fleming, Dame Kiri Te Kanawa, Andre Watts, Alicia de Larrocha, Pinchas Zukerman, Van Cliburn, Lynn Harrell, Itzhak Perlman ed i compositori John Cage, Joseph Schwantner, Ellen Taffe Zwilich, John Harbison, Joan Tower e Bernard Rands tra gli altri.

In January 2019 the Baton Rouge Symphony Orchestra announced that Timothy Muffitt will leave his position next year. Muffitt will conduct the orchestra until the 2019-20 season, his twentieth season with the organization, and will therefore be appointed Laureate Music Director.

References

External links
 
 
 
 
 
 
 

American conductors (music)
American male conductors (music)
20th-century American conductors (music)
21st-century American conductors (music)
1961 births
Living people
Eastman School of Music
People from Fairfield County, Connecticut
People from Bridgeport, Connecticut
20th-century American male musicians
21st-century American male musicians